Secret state may refer to:

 Polish Underground State, a collective term for the underground resistance organizations in Poland during World War II loyal to the government-in-exile
 Secret State (TV miniseries), a four-part British political thriller from 2012